Cyclothea is a genus of moths in the family Geometridae described by Prout in 1912.

Species
Cyclothea catathymia Prout, 1938
Cyclothea disjuncta Walker, 1861
Cyclothea exaereta West, 1930

References

Geometrinae